James Milburn Marquis (November 18, 1900 – August 5, 1992) was a Major League Baseball pitcher. Marquis played for the New York Yankees during the  season. In two games, he had a 0-0 record with a 9.82 ERA. He batted and threw right-handed. He was born in Yoakum, Texas and died in Jackson, California.

External links

1900 births
1992 deaths
Major League Baseball pitchers
Baseball players from Texas
New York Yankees players
People from Yoakum, Texas